Yeduguri Sandinti Vivekananda Reddy (8 August 1951 – 15 March 2019) was a member of the 14th Lok Sabha of India. He represented the Kadapa constituency of Andhra Pradesh. He was a member of the Indian National Congress. He was brutally stabbed to death at his residence in Pulivendula, Kadapa district on March 2019.

Personal life
Being born into a  middle-class family on 8 August 1951 to Y. S. Raja Reddy and Y. S. Jayamma, Vivekananda Reddy was the younger brother of the former Chief Minister of Andhra Pradesh Y. S. Rajasekhara Reddy. He was a graduate in agriculture from S. V. Agricultural College in Tirupati. He has one daughter.

Family tree

Political career
Vivekananda Reddy was the designer of Lingala Canal in Kadapa district. He began his services to the community through the Lions Club, became its district governor and the Samithi president.

He was twice elected as a Member of the Legislative Assembly for the Pulivendula constituency, in 1989 and 1994. Then, in the elections of 1999, he was elected to the Lok Sabha from the Kadapa constituency with a majority of over 90,000 votes, which was the highest majority gained in the state at that time. In 2004 elections he increased that majority to over 110,000.

In September 2009, he was elected as a member of the Andhra Pradesh Legislative Council. On 30 November 2010, he became Agriculture Minister in the Andhra Pradesh cabinet headed by N. Kiran Kumar Reddy.

Later, in 2011, he contested the Pulivendula by-elections caused due to Jaganmohan Reddy and his mother, Y. S. Vijayamma, leaving the Congress party to form YSR Congress Party. He stood as the Congress candidate against his sister-in-law and just managed to secure his deposit after finishing in second place but some 80,000 votes behind Y. S. Vijayamma. His sister in law party YSRCP has demanded a CBI probe for investigation.

Murder of Vivekananda Reddy 
As per post-mortem reports, Vivekananda Reddy has been brutally murdered and found at his residence in Kadapa on 15 March 2019. The murder took place few weeks before the 2019 Andhra Pradesh General Elections. As per the coroner's report, seven stab wounds were found on his body made by a sharp object.

According to reports, he was alone at his residence in Pulivendula the night before his murder. Two days earlier, he was seen at Jaganmohan Reddy's residence at Hyderabad. YSRCP expressed distrust of the Special Investigation Team (SIT) formed by the TDP government and demanded a CBI investigation into the murder.

A prime suspect, Srinivasulu Reddy, killed himself by taking sleeping pills. Reportedly, in a suicide note, he alleged he was harassed by the police with false allegations. Another suspect, Parameswara Reddy, an old friend of Vivekananda Reddy, has claimed he was victimised and harassed in the name of the probe.

Jaganmohan Reddy petitioned the High court seeking a CBI inquiry into his uncle's murder. After a change of government, in May 2019 he constituted a new SIT of the state police to probe the murder and tried to withdraw his petition in the court demanding CBI probe.

In January 2020, his daughter filed a writ petition in High Court seeking a CBI investigation and expressed doubts over the investigation by SIT. She alleged suspicions of Y. S. Avinash Reddy, who was one of the first to arrive at the murder scene.

In March 2020, the High Court expressed dissatisfaction over the lack of progress in the investigation by the state police as the murder completed a year. The court ordered CBI to begin the investigation and complete at the earliest. In June 2021, CBI resumed the investigation which was put on hold due to COVID-19 pandemic in India.

References

External links
 Official biographical sketch in Parliament of India website

Indian National Congress politicians from Andhra Pradesh
1951 births
2019 deaths
Indian Anglicans
India MPs 2004–2009
India MPs 1999–2004
Telugu politicians
Lok Sabha members from Andhra Pradesh
Sri Venkateswara University alumni
People from Kadapa district
YSR Congress Party politicians
Deaths by stabbing in India